The king of the parakeets is a folktale from Aceh in northern Sumatra. The story is about the leader of the parakeets, who tried to escape from a golden cage after being trapped.

References

Culture of Aceh
Indonesian folklore
Legendary birds